Ding may refer to:

Bronze and ceramics
 Ding (vessel), a bronze or ceramic cauldron used in ancient and early imperial China
 Ding ware, ceramics produced in Dingzhou in medieval China

People 
 Ding (surname) (丁), a Chinese surname and list of people with the name
 Duke Ding of Jin (died 475 BC), ruler of Jin
 Duke Ding of Qi, tenth century ruler of Qi
 Empress Dowager Ding (died 402), empress dowager of the state of Later Yan
 King Ding of Zhou, king of the Zhou Dynasty in ancient China from 606 to 586 BC
 Ding Darling (1876–1962), American cartoonist who signed his work "Ding"

Arts and entertainment
 "Ding" (song), by Seeed
 Ding, the nickname of Domingo Chavez, a recurring character in Tom Clancy's novels and video games
 Ding, a webcomic by Scott Kurtz
 D!NG, a spinoff web channel from Vsauce

Places
 Dingzhou, formerly Ding County and Ding Prefecture, China
 Ding railway station, Haryana, India

Other uses 
 (ding) or Gnus, a news reader
 Ding language, Bantu language spoken in the Democratic Republic of Congo
 Donau-Iller-Nahverkehrsverbund (DING), a German regional transport cooperative
 ding up, to dent, bend, or injure
 Ding (company), international mobile recharge service

See also

 
 
 Dinge
 Dinger (disambiguation)
 Bing (disambiguation)
 Ping (disambiguation)